Caribe is a 2004 Costa Rican drama film directed by Esteban Ramírez. It was selected as the Costa Rican entry for the Best Foreign Language Film at the 78th Academy Awards, but it was not nominated.

Cast
 Jorge Perugorría as Vicente Vallejo
 Cuca Escribano as Abigail
 Maya Zapata as Irene
 Roberto McLean as Jackson
 Vinicio Rojas as Ezequiel
 Thelma Darkings as Lorraine

See also
 List of submissions to the 78th Academy Awards for Best Foreign Language Film
 List of Costa Rican submissions for the Academy Award for Best International Feature Film

References

External links
 

2004 films
2004 drama films
Costa Rican drama films
2000s Spanish-language films